David Boutin (born November 12, 1969) is a Canadian actor from Quebec. He is most noted for his performance in the 2000 film Hochelaga, for which he won the Jutra Award for Best Supporting Actor at the 3rd Jutra Awards in 2001.

His other credits have included the films The Countess of Baton Rouge (La Comtesse de Bâton Rouge), The Long Winter (Quand je serai parti... vous vivrez encore), Marriages (Mariages), On Your Head (Le Ciel sur la tête), Inside (Histoire de pen), Seducing Doctor Lewis (La Grande séduction), Tideline (Littoral), A Family Secret (Le Secret de ma mère), The Broken Line (La Ligne brisée), Je me souviens, Trash (Décharge) and 1:54, and the television series Diva, Tag, Temps dur, H2O, Human Trafficking, Rumeurs, Tout sur moi, Nouvelle adresse, District 31 and Les Pays d'en haut.

References

External links

1969 births
21st-century Canadian male actors
21st-century Canadian male writers
21st-century Canadian dramatists and playwrights
Canadian male dramatists and playwrights
Canadian male film actors
Canadian male television actors
Canadian male stage actors
Male actors from Montreal
French Quebecers
Living people
Writers from Montreal
Best Supporting Actor Jutra and Iris Award winners